The ADCC Submission Fighting World Championship,  is an international submission grappling competition, organised by the Abu Dhabi Combat Club (ADCC). The   inaugural tournament was held in Abu Dhabi, UAE in 1998. It has been held every two years since, except in 2021 due to the worldwide COVID-19 pandemic. Host countries have included Brazil, China, Finland, Spain, the UK, and the US.

Competitors can only participate after winning ADCC trials or by invitation. While most athletes come from the IBJJF Brazilian jiu-jitsu competitive scene, it is open to competitors from any grappling style. The 2022 edition took place in front of 13,000 fans in attendance at the Thomas & Mack Center in Las Vegas.

ADCC  is  considered the most prestigious submission grappling tournament in the world, and is commonly referred to as "the Olympics of grappling".

History 
The competition was created by Sheik Tahnoun Bin Zayed Al Nahyan, the son of the former United Arab Emirates president Sheikh Zayed bin Sultan Al Nahyan, together with his Brazilian Jiu-Jitsu instructor Nelson Monteiro. Royler Gracie characterized this as the beginning of "the modern era of submission grappling".
Thousands of submission grappling tournaments around the world use elements of the ADCC format and rule structure. To date, the great majority of ADCC champions have had experience studying the art of Brazilian Jiu-Jitsu, whose rules are the most similar to. However, there have been notable exceptions to this, such as Japanese Sanae Kikuta (Judo/Shoot Wrestling), South African Mark Robinson (Judo, Greco-Roman wrestling and Freestyle wrestling, Sumo), and American Mark Kerr (Collegiate/Freestyle Wrestling).

For the future of the event the organizer Mo Jassim has plans for adding more women's divisions and allowing reigning absolute champions to compete in weight-classes despite being booked for the main event superfight. It was announced in 2020 that for the first time in the competition's history, there would be more than two years between editions due to the setbacks suffered as a result of the COVID-19 pandemic. The 2021 edition of the ADCC World Championships would then take place in 2022 instead.

At the end of 2021, ADCC was awarded with 'Promotion of the year' by media outlet Jitsmagazine at the 2021 BJJ Awards as a result of the trials events held that year and the introduction of the ADCC Hall of Fame.

In 2022, ADCC was awarded with 'Promotion of the Year' by Jitsmagazine at the 2022 BJJ Awards for the second year in a row, and the 2022 ADCC World Championships was awarded with 'Fight Card of the Year'.

In 2023, ADCC signed an exclusive multi-year streaming deal with UFC Fight Pass, leaving their previous broadcaster FloSports.

ADCC world championships

List of ADCC Champions in Men's Submission Fighting by Year and Weight

List of ADCC Champions in Women's Submission Fighting by Year and Weight

List of ADCC Superfight Champions

List of winners by total titles

Triple Crown Winners (weight, absolute and superfight) 
  Mario Sperry
  Mark Kerr
  Ricardo Arona
  Roger Gracie
  Braulio Estima
  Dean Lister
  André Galvão
  Gordon Ryan

ADCC Hall of Fame 

  Roger Gracie
  Andre Galvao
  Marcelo Garcia
  Ricardo Arona
  Kyra Gracie
  Braulio Estima
  Royler Gracie
  Dean Lister
  Mario Sperry
  Rubens Charles
  Saulo Ribeiro
  Mark Kerr
  Baret Yoshida
  Renzo Gracie
  Rafael Mendes

Most submissions

By nationality

ADCC events

ADCC 2022

ADCC 2019

Absolute

ADCC 2017

Absolute

ADCC 2015

Absolute

ADCC 2013

ADCC 2011

Absolute

Superfight 
Superfight 1:  Braulio Estima vs.  Ronaldo Souza
 Estima defeated Souza via points (3-0).
Superfight 2:  Renzo Gracie vs.  Mario Sperry
 Sperry defeated Gracie via points (5-0).

ADCC 2009

Absolute

Superfight 
Superfight:  Robert Drysdale vs.  Ronaldo Souza
 Souza defeated Drysdale via points (2-0).

ADCC 2007

ADCC 2005

ADCC 2003

ADCC 2001

ADCC 2000

ADCC 1999

ADCC 1998

ADCC Trials

ADCC Asian and Oceanic Championship

ADCC European Championship

ADCC North American Championship

ADCC South American Championship

See also 

ADCC weight classes
List of ADCC Hall of Fame inductees

References

Further reading 

.
.
.
.

External links 
 ADCC Homepage

Sports competitions in the United Arab Emirates
Martial arts in the United Arab Emirates
Grappling competitions
Submission wrestling
Sport in Abu Dhabi

pl:ADCC Submission Fighting World Championships 2009